Carlos Teodor de Cárdenas Culmell (1904–1994) was a Cuban Olympic sailor who won a silver medal in the 1948 Summer Olympics. He also placed fourth in the 1952 Summer Olympics and sixth in the 1956 Summer Olympics.

de Cárdenas is the father of Cuban Olympic sailors Carlos de Cárdenas, Jr. and Jorge de Cárdenas.He also won a World Championship {Gold] Star in Chicago , Illinois.

References

1904 births
1994 deaths
Sportspeople from Havana
Olympic silver medalists for Cuba
Sailors at the 1948 Summer Olympics – Star
Sailors at the 1952 Summer Olympics – Star
Sailors at the 1956 Summer Olympics – Star
Olympic sailors of Cuba
Cuban male sailors (sport)
Medalists at the 1948 Summer Olympics
Star class world champions
World champions in sailing for Cuba
Cuban emigrants to the United States
20th-century Cuban people